Raymond v. Raymond is the sixth studio album by American singer Usher, released on March 26, 2010, by LaFace Records. Production for the album took place in 2009 and was handled by several producers, including Jermaine Dupri, The Runners, Ester Dean, Polow da Don, RedOne, Jim Jonsin, Danja, Jimmy Jam & Terry Lewis, Bangladesh, Zaytoven, and Tricky Stewart.

The album debuted at number one on the US Billboard 200 chart, selling 329,000 copies in its first week. It sold over one million copies in the United States and was certified platinum by the Recording Industry Association of America (RIAA). The album also produced five singles that achieved chart success, including US hits "Hey Daddy (Daddy's Home)", "Lil Freak", "There Goes My Baby", and international hits "OMG" and "More".

Upon its release, Raymond v. Raymond received generally mixed reviews from music critics, who were ambivalent towards its songwriting and themes. Nonetheless, the album earned Usher several awards, including Grammy Awards for Best Contemporary R&B Album and Best Male R&B Vocal Performance. Usher promoted the album with a supporting international tour, OMG Tour, in 2011.

Background 
In December 2005, Usher became romantically involved with stylist Tameka Foster, whom he then married on August 3, 2007. Foster gave birth to Usher Raymond V later that year. Usher released his fifth studio album Here I Stand on May 13, 2008. It featured more mature, adult-oriented themes, influenced by his marriage to Foster; this thematic shift ultimately led to the album becoming less successful with fans and sales than his previous work. A year and a half later on June 12, 2009, following his marriage, Usher filed for divorce from Foster, with no initial reasoning. Once the divorce was finalized on November 8 that year, Usher explained that there was "no reasonable hope of reconciliation" and their marriage was "irretrievably broken"; both Foster and Usher had been living separately since July 2008. The divorce was highly documented by the press.

Prior to the filing, Usher relocated to Las Vegas in 2009 to begin working on his sixth studio album. The album was recorded at the Studio at the Palms in Vegas and Atlanta. Producers involved with its production included Jermaine Dupri, The Runners, Ester Dean, Polow da Don, RedOne, Jim Jonsin, |Danja, Jimmy Jam & Terry Lewis, Bangladesh and Tricky Stewart. Initially under the title Monster,  the album's name was changed to Raymond v. Raymond, taking inspiration from the 1979 American drama film Kramer vs. Kramer.

Raymond v. Raymond mirrors Usher's 2004 Confessions, as a self-confessional album, with several recordings from the album inferring to Usher's marriage. Jive Records urban music president and album executive producer Mark Pitts also conceived the album as a return to the themes of the latter album; "based on what happened with Confessions", Pitts wanted to reproduce its success. Pitts told The New York Times that "Usher had a rough couple years", elaborating: "The scrutiny of everything going on, he was worrying too much about what people were thinking. We felt like we had to get his swagger back. Dust off the bed and get it popping and young again." Pitts noted that it was important Raymond v. Raymond addressed the rumors that circulated around Usher's marriage. The latter reiterated that the album is not specifically about his marriage, and that it is "about the tug-of-war between man and woman, and the honesty a man has to have."

Singles 
"Hey Daddy (Daddy's Home)" was released as the first single on December 8, 2009. The single peaked at number 24 on the Billboard Hot 100 chart and number two on the Hot R&B/Hip-Hop Songs chart. The song also peaked at number sixty-eight on the Austrian Singles Chart. Its music video was directed by Chris Robinson, and was shot in West Hollywood at "The London". It premiered on MTV on January 28, 2010. For the album's second single, "Lil Freak", Usher and featured artist Nicki Minaj shot a music video for the song on March 9, 2010 in Los Angeles with director TAJ. The single reached number eight on the Hot R&B/Hip-Hop Songs chart and number 40 on the Billboard Hot 100. It also peaked at number 109 on the UK Singles Chart.

The album's fourth single, "OMG", featuring will.i.am, reached number one on the Billboard Hot 100. It also reached number one in Ireland, New Zealand, the United Kingdom, and Australia. The song became his ninth number-one hit in the US, making him the first 2010s artist to collect number-one singles in three consecutive decades, and only the fourth artist of all-time to achieve the feat. Usher also became the third artist ever to have at least one Hot 100 number-one hit from five consecutive studio albums. The single stayed at number one on the chart for four weeks, including three consecutive. It finished at the top of the year-end Billboard charts. It was also named the fifth best-selling song of 2010, selling 3.8 million units.

"There Goes My Baby", which was released as the second promotional single prior to the album's release, was released to airplay as the album's fourth single in the United States on June 15, 2010. It reached number twenty-five on the Billboard Hot 100, and number one on the Hot R&B/Hip-Hop Songs chart, becoming Usher's eleventh number-one hit on the latter. The song earned Usher a Grammy Award for Best Male R&B Vocal Performance, at the 53rd Grammy Awards in 2011. "More" was released as the album's fifth and final single, on December 6, 2010. "More" peaked at number 15 on the Billboard Hot 100. The single reached number one in Canada. It also reached the top-ten in Australia, Belgium, and Norway, and the top-twenty in Denmark, France, New Zealand, and Sweden.

Release and promotion 
In November 2009, a representative of Usher told MTV News that the album will not be released on December 21, 2009 as scheduled: "The release of Usher's next album, Raymond v. Raymond, has been delayed because we believe that the album is so strong that we want to give it the opportunity to have the proper setup before coming out". The album's release was pushed back again due to Usher experiencing issues in obtaining management, following him parting ways with his then manager, Jonetta Patton, also his mother, in late November 2009. Patton had severed management ties with Usher due to his relationship with former Def Jam executive Grace Miguel, and she felt "if she didn't end things when she did, it would permanently affect their personal relationship." Raymond v. Raymond was ultimately released on March 30, 2010 in the United States, and released on April 26, 2010 in the United Kingdom.

Versus was announced as a follow-up to Raymond v. Raymond on July 8, 2010, and is Usher's first extended play. Described during a press release as "the last chapter of Raymond v. Raymond", Usher stated that the EP will explore the subjects of being newly single and a father. It would include Raymond v. Raymond single "There Goes My Baby", as well as 8 new tracks. Several producers from the latter album contributed to the production of the EP, including Polow da Don, Jim Jonsin, Rico Love, Drumma Boy,  Jimmy Jam and Terry Lewis, Tha Cornaboyz and Max Martin. Versus''' track listing and album cover was revealed on July 21, 2010. Despite some criticism towards its pop-oriented material, the EP received generally positive reviews from most music critics. It went on to sell 302,000 copies in the US.

 Tour 

In 2010, Usher competed in a dance battle against fellow R&B artist Chris Brown at the Reggae Sumfest. The battle sparked an Internet rumor of the two possibly going on tour. This was further pushed by producer Jermaine Dupri alluding that the two artist may be unaware of this upcoming tour. The singers later took to Twitter to ask who the fans would like to see them perform with. On September 8, 2010, the singer announced his touring trek (and revealed it was solo) for North America. Due to demand, many additional stops in Europe and Australasia were added. It was Usher's first arena tour in six years; his last being his 2004 effort, The Truth Tour. The then announced OMG Tour commenced on November 10, 2010 and concluded on June 1, 2011 with Usher performing in a total of 92 shows. In its conclusion, the tour placed seventh on Billboard's annual "Top 25 Tours", earning nearly $75 million.

 Critical reception Raymond v. Raymond received generally mixed reviews from music critics. At Metacritic, which assigns a normalized rating out of 100 to reviews from mainstream critics, the album has received an average score of 57, based on 16 reviews, which indicates "generally mixed or average reviews". AllMusic editor Andy Kellman was ambivalent towards its lyrical content and stated, "Many of the songs on the album have to be taken on their own, stripped of context; otherwise, determining what applies to Usher's real and fantasy lives can be problematic". Tyler Fisher of Sputnikmusic found the album thematically inconsistent and called it "a predictably unfocused album". Matthew Cole of Slant Magazine called it "consistently uninspired, with each song showcasing an incredibly gifted performer grown wearyingly complacent".

Camilla Pia of NME observed "quite a bit of forgettable bravado babble". Chicago Tribune writer Greg Kot viewed that its "songs about 'So Many Girls' and the burden of being a 'Pro Lover' on the prowl" inversely affect the mature-themed songs, writing "It's the kind of lacerating perspective that adulthood brings, but Usher's too busy chasing his past to fully embrace it". Tyler Lewis of PopMatters called Raymond v. Raymond a "cynically commercial and desperate album" and viewed it as a "pale imitation" of Usher's Confessions. The Village Voices Rich Juzwiak called its confessional nature "wan" and compared its songs negatively to "pick-up lines: Their immediate success varies, but none are particularly memorable".

In a positive review, Mikael Wood of the Los Angeles Times felt that the album emphasizes "the wily lothario of yore" in response to "Usher fans disappointed by the change in direction his wedding inspired". Andrew Rennie of Now wrote, "his sixth album proves that his ability to make grown-up hits is stronger than ever." Billboards Gail Mitchell called it "a more cohesive collection" than Here I Stand, "centered on the different sides that comprise the artist".

 Accolades 
The album earned Usher three American Music Award nominations. He won two of the awards for Favorite R&B Album and Favorite Soul/R&B Male Artist. The album also earned him four Soul Train Music Award nominations; including, Best R&B/Soul Artist Male, Song of the Year, Album of the Year, and Best Dance Performance. Usher tied Alicia Keys for the most Soul Train Music Award nominations that year. He won two of the nominations for Best Male R&B/Soul Artist and Album of the Year award. At the 53rd Grammy Awards in 2011, Raymond v. Raymond won both its nominations for Best Contemporary R&B Album and Best Male R&B Vocal Performance. Usher won a NRJ Music Award for International Male Artist of the Year.

Usher appeared on several Billboard year-end charts in 2010; he was ranked as the third top US Billboard Hot 100 artist. He was placed as the top R&B/Hip Hop Artist, the sixth top overall artist, and the ninth top Pop artist. The following year, Usher won three Billboard Music Awards, receiving honors as Top R&B Artist, Top R&B Album for Raymond v. Raymond, and Top R&B Song for "OMG".

 Commercial performance 
The album debuted at number one on the US Billboard 200 chart with first-week sales of 329,107 copies, becoming Usher's third consecutive US number-one album. Its first week sales, at the time of its release, served as the third-largest one-week sales of 2010 in the US. According to Billboard, the album's first-week sales had been supported by his appearances on the television shows American Idol and The Ellen DeGeneres Show, both of which featured him performing the single "OMG". The album sold over 92,000 copies in the US in its second week of release. It sold over 64,000 copies in its third week of release. It then sold 52,000 copies in its fourth week of release. In its fifth week of release it sold 48,000 copies. In its sixth week of release sales increased with 51,000 copies sold. By March 2012, it has sold over 1.3 million copies in the US. On June 17, 2010, Raymond v. Raymond was certified platinum by the Recording Industry Association of America (RIAA). The album topped the US Top R&B/Hip-Hop Albums chart for seven consecutive weeks. It was placed as one of the ten best selling albums of 2010, ranking at number nine, selling 1.18 million copies that year.

The album debuted at number four in Canada, and has been certified platinum by the Canadian Recording Industry Association (CRIA), for shipments of 80,000 copies. Raymond v. Raymond debuted at number two in the United Kingdom, with English rapper Plan B's The Defamation of Strickland Banks debuting at number one. The latter album opened with 41,001 copies sold with Raymond v. Raymond opening with 40,788 units. Its first week figures are lower than Usher's three preceding albums. Raymond v. Raymond reached number-two in Australia and the album has been certified platinum by the Australian Record Industry Association (ARIA). It also entered within the top-ten of charts in several other countries. The album's tracks and ring tones have sold more than seven million combined units, and by December 1, 2010, the album itself had sold over 2 million copies worldwide.

 Legacy and Impact 
Web publication Rated R&B celebrated Raymond v. Raymond's tenth anniversary by ranking the six singles from the album.  The editor, Danielle Brissett, wrote about the state of Usher's career at the time and how Raymond v. Raymond was seen as a comeback of sorts, after his previous studio album, Here I Stand, was seen as an "unexpected fall from grace" after the blockbuster success of Confessions. With Raymond v. Raymond Usher returned to form, as he "gave fans what they wanted and returned to his ladies’ man persona but with a seasoned approach". The album was the ninth best-selling album of 2010 in the US with 1.18 million copies sold, and the Hot 100 number 1 smash "OMG" featuring will.i.am. became the fifth best-selling digital single of the year and ranked 60th on Billboard's Hot 100 Songs of the Decade list.  The editor goes on, saying that while Usher had been in the industry with a career spanning three decades, "[he] made it clear that he hadn't lost his sly, yet irresistible euphonic charm" as "he led Billboard's year-end tally in 2010 as the top R&B male performer".

Not only was Raymond v. Raymond a commercial comeback for the singer in 2010 - with each single peaking within the top 40 on the Billboard Hot 100 and the OMG Tour becoming his highest grossing concert tour to date - but it extended his reign as "the biggest male pop star in the world".Raymond v. Raymond was ranked 113th on the Decade-End Billboard 200 chart.  "OMG" became the only song by a male R&B artist to reach the top spot on the Billboard Hot 100, and "DJ Got Us Fallin' In Love" made Raymond v. Raymond the only R&B album with multiple singles to reach the top 5 of the Billboard Hot 100 that decade. Raymond v. Raymond was not only Usher's most successful album in the 2010s, but one of the most successful R&B albums that decade.

 Track listing 

Notes
 "So Many Girls" features additional vocals by Diddy.

Sample credits
 "Get in My Car" samples Leon Russell and Marc Benno's song "Mr. Henri the Clown".
 "Lil Freak" samples Stevie Wonder's 1973 "Living for the City".
 "Making Love (Into the Night)" contains a portion of composition from Benny Mardones' 1980 "Into The Night".
 "She Don't Know" samples Ebo Taylor's 1977 "Heaven".

 Personnel 
Credits for Raymond v. Raymond adapted from AllMusic.

 Kory Aaron – assistant
 Marcella Araica – engineer
 Alex Barajas – assistant
 Tom Coyne – mastering
 Ian Cross – engineer, mixing, vocal engineer
 Aubry "Big Juice" Delaine – engineer
 Dylan "3-D" Dresdow – mixing
 Jermaine Dupri – mixing
 Joe Gallagher – assistant
 Conor Gilligan – assistant
 Melvin "Melomuzic" Parker - piano 
 Matty Green – assistant
 Blake Harden – assistant
 Kemal Harris – stylist
 Patrick Hewlett – assistant
 Gordon Hogan – assistant
 Sam Holland – assistant
 John Horesco IV – engineer
 Bob Horn – mixing
 Jaycen Joshua – mixing
 Damien Lewis – assistant
 Giancarlo Lino – assistant
 Erik Madrid – assistant
 Michael Makowski – assistant
 Anthony Mandler – photography
 Rob Marks – engineer
 Frank Romano – guitar

 Matt Marrin – engineer, mixing
 Manny Marroquin – mixing
 Thurston McCrea – assistant
 Andrew Mezzi – assistant
 Brandon Middleton – assistant
 Vernon Mungo – engineer
 Brandon Parks – assistant
 Nicole Patterson – make-up
 Jonetta Patton – artist development
 Karl Peterson – assistant
 Mark Pitts – executive producer, A&R
 Shawn Porter – groomer
 Usher Raymond – executive producer
 Rob Skipworth – engineer
 Tim Sonnefeld – mixing
 Brian Stanley – mixing
 Mark "Spike" Stent – mixing
 Jay Stevenson – engineer
 Phil Tan – mixing
 Matt Taylor – art direction, design
 Miles Walker – engineer
 Jason Wilkie – assistant
 will.i.am – engineer
 Tre Williams – engineer
 James Wisner – engineer
 Lauren Evans – background vocals

 Charts 

 Weekly charts 

 Year-end charts 

 Decade-end charts 

 Certifications 

 Release history 

See also
 List of number-one albums of 2010 (U.S.)
 List of number-one R&B albums of 2010 (U.S.)

References

External links
 Raymond v. Raymond'' at Discogs (list of releases)

2010 albums
Usher (musician) albums
Albums produced by Bangladesh (record producer)
Albums produced by Bryan-Michael Cox
Albums produced by Danja (record producer)
Albums produced by Jermaine Dupri
Albums produced by Jim Jonsin
Albums produced by Jimmy Jam and Terry Lewis
Albums produced by Sean Garrett
Albums produced by Polow da Don
Albums produced by RedOne
Albums produced by Rico Love
Albums produced by the Runners
Albums produced by will.i.am
Albums produced by Zaytoven
Albums produced by Max Martin
LaFace Records albums
Jive Records albums
Grammy Award for Best Contemporary R&B Album